The following is a list of mayors of the city of Chernihiv, Ukraine. It includes positions equivalent to mayor, such as chairperson of the city council executive committee.

Mayors 
 Silchenko Ivan Danilovich (Сильченко Іван Данилович), 1943-1944
 Sergeev Nikolay Vasilyevich (Сергеєв Микола Васильович), 1944
 Savchenko GA (Савченко Г. А.), 1944
 Shabaydash Mikhail Andreevich (Шабайдаш Михайло Андрійович), 1944
 Kozlyanin AA (Козлянін А.А.), 1944-1945
 Kulikov GI (Куликов Г.І.), 1945-1947
 Kushnaryov Miron Yakovlevich (Кушнарьов Мирон Якович), 1947
 Silchenko Ivan Danilovich (Сильченко Іван Данилович), 1948-1956
 Dus Victor Ivanovich (Дусь Віктор Іванович), 1956-1963
 Andrievsky Vsevolod Vladimirovich (Андрієвський Всеволод Володимирович), 1963-1966
  (Муха Степан Несторович), 1966-1970
 Kramarenko Mykola Ivanovych (Крамаренко Микола Іванович), 1970-1973
 Kudin Grigory Fedorovich (Кудін Григорій Федорович), 1973-1979
  (Балука Степан Іванович), 1979-1984
 Tavanets Alexander Fedorovich (Таванець Олександр Федорович), 1984-1988
 Litvinov Mykola Ivanovych (Літвінов Микола Іванович), 1988-1990
 Lysenko Anatoliy Oleksandrovych (Лисенко Анатолій Олександрович), 1990
  (Мельничук Валентин Васильович), 1990-1992
  (Косих Віталій Анатолійович), 1992-2001
  (Соколов Олександр Володимирович), 2002-2015 
  (Рудьковський Микола Миколайович), 2006
 Vladyslav Atroshenko, 2015-At Present

See also
 Chernihiv history
 History of Chernihiv (in Ukrainian)

References

This article incorporates information from the Ukrainian Wikipedia.

External links

History of Chernihiv Oblast
Chernihiv